Twin Falls is a populated place situated in Apache County, Arizona, United States, along the border with New Mexico.

References

Populated places in Apache County, Arizona